Cary Bren (born 8 May 1959) is an American former racing driver. He is from Santa Ana, California.

Cary took part in the first four races of the 1986 International Formula 3000 season but only qualified for one race, finishing 21st at Silverstone. He is the brother of another racing driver, Steve Bren and one of seven children of businessman Donald Bren.

References

1959 births
Living people
American people of Irish descent
American people of Jewish descent
International Formula 3000 drivers
SCCA Formula Super Vee drivers
Indy Lights drivers
Sportspeople from Santa Ana, California
Racing drivers from California